Barnfield may refer to:

Barnfield (surname)
Barnfield College, a college in Bedfordshire, England
Barnfield Estate, a housing estate in southeast London, England
Barnfield, Luton, a ward of Luton, Bedfordshire, England
Barnfield, Exeter, a suburb of Exeter, England
Barnfield Theatre, a theater in Exeter, England
Henry Barnfield Fund, a charity dedicated to finding a cure for pediatric brain cancer